Changzhong Road is a station on Line 7 of the Shanghai Metro. It began operation on December 5, 2009.

Railway stations in Shanghai
Line 7, Shanghai Metro
Shanghai Metro stations in Baoshan District
Railway stations in China opened in 2009